The British Rail Class 315 was a fleet of alternating current (AC) electric multiple unit (EMU) trains, built by British Rail Engineering Limited at Holgate Road Carriage Works in York between 1980 and 1981; they replaced the Class 306 units. Revenue services with Class 315 units commenced in 1980 and continued until December 2022.

Description

Each Class 315 unit is formed of four vehicles; ---DMSO. Up to three units can be used together in service for a maximum 12-car formation.

The order included an element of dual-sourcing 41 units (315801–315841) were fitted with electrical equipment from Brush Traction, while equipment for the remaining 20 units (315842–315861) was provided by the General Electric Company (GEC). The traction motors are interchangeable between equipment providers.

The DMSO vehicles also carry the air compressors and main reservoirs that provide the braking and suspension air supplies. The air supply was originally additionally used to operate the passenger doors, but this system was later replaced by an all-electric one.

The PTSO vehicles carry the main and auxiliary transformers, auxiliary batteries, the Stone Faiveley AMBR Mk.1 pantograph, and the main circuit breaker, while the TSO vehicles only provide passenger accommodation. 

Seating is standard-class only and there are no toilet facilities provided onboard. As-built, each four-car unit had seats for 318 passengers, but this was reduced to 309 plus seven tip-up during a refit in 2012 

Vehicles are numbered in the following ranges:
 DMSO: 64461–64582
 PTSO: 71281–71341
 TSO: 71389–71449

Operations 

Following the privatisation of British Rail, the Class 315s were divided between First Great Eastern (43 units) and West Anglia Great Northern (18 units). The leasing company Eversholt Rail Group has owned the entire Class 315 fleet since privatisation.

One / National Express 

From April 2004, National Express East Anglia (NXEA) ran the inaugural Greater Anglia franchise, which combined the previous operations of both First Great Eastern and West Anglia Great Northern and thus combined the two Class 315 fleets. The franchise was initially known as 'One' but was rebranded National Express East Anglia (NXEA) in February 2008.

NXEA contracted with Bombardier to refurbish all 61 units at a cost of £60 million. This commenced in mid-2004 with the  ex-First Great Eastern examples, and included the full replacement of door operating mechanisms, passenger windows, and seat covers, substantial replacement of floor coverings, and the installation of CCTV.

Greater Anglia 

The Class 315 fleet transferred to new operator Abellio Greater Anglia in February 2012. Abellio repainted the trains in its own livery and commissioned Bombardier to refresh the fleet, which included installation of a new passenger information system with electronic dot-matrix display screens, installation of bays for two wheelchairs and assistance intercoms for passengers in those areas, and accessibility changes to the handrails and inter-car gangways. 

Initially, the Shenfield Metro and Upminster branch line services used only units 315801–315843 and the Lea Valley Lines only 315844–315861, reflecting the allocations of the former franchises, but they were later operated interchangeably out of Ilford EMU Depot.

Elizabeth line 
The remainder of the fleet was operated by MTR Elizabeth line, who used them for a small number of Elizabeth line services on the Great Eastern Main Line between London Liverpool Street and Shenfield as a continuation of the previous TfL Rail operation.

A farewell tour for the class organised by the Branch Line Society was announced in October 2022 and took place on 26 November.

The last day of service for the Class 315 units was 9 December 2022.

Replacement
In July 2015, TfL confirmed that it would place a £260million order for 45 units of Class 710 Aventra trains, which would replace London Overground's Class 315. The Aventras would be introduced on the West Anglia routes in 2018, having taken these over from Abellio Greater Anglia in May 2015. The first units on the Lea Valley lines entered service on 3 March 2020, after a first attempt on 24 February 2020. They replaced all Class 315s on both the Lea Valley lines and the Romford to Upminster branch in October 2020.

Additionally, TfL Rail Class 315 units were replaced by the new Class 345 Aventra from August 2017. On 20 October 2018, the first retired unit, 315850, was hauled to C F Booth of Rotherham to be scrapped. The last Elizabeth line unit in service was on 9 December 2022, after which all of the units had either been scrapped, stored or preserved.

Fleet details

Livery diagrams

Named units 
The following units have carried names
315827 – Transport for London
315829 – London Borough of Havering Celebrating 40 years
315845 – Herbie Woodward
315857 – Stratford Connections

Preservation 
On 23 July 2021, the Class 315 Preservation Society announced on their website that they had reached an agreement in principle with Eversholt Rail Group to acquire a Class 315 for preservation, and the sale was confirmed on 1 December 2022. The society had originally planned on acquiring unit 315820, but following the finalisation of the sale agreement stated that they had instead secured unit 315856.

References

Further reading

315
315
Train-related introductions in 1980
25 kV AC multiple units